Ágnes Szijj (born 2 August 1956) is a Hungarian rower. She competed in the women's quadruple sculls event at the 1976 Summer Olympics.

References

External links
 
 

1956 births
Living people
Hungarian female rowers
Olympic rowers of Hungary
Rowers at the 1976 Summer Olympics
Rowers from Budapest